Terminal Warehouse, also known as the Flour Warehouse of Terminal Corporation, is a historic warehouse building located at Baltimore, Maryland, United States. It has a common bond brick exterior accented by a rusticated brownstone foundation built originally in 1894, with a steel beam addition constructed in 1912. It was designed by noted Baltimore architect Benjamin B. Owens.

Terminal Warehouse was listed on the National Register of Historic Places in 1978.

References

External links
, including undated photo, at Maryland Historical Trust
Terminal Warehouse – Explore Baltimore Heritage

Downtown Baltimore
Buildings and structures in Baltimore
Commercial buildings on the National Register of Historic Places in Baltimore
Warehouses on the National Register of Historic Places
Commercial buildings completed in 1894